North Logan is a city in Cache County, Utah, United States. The population was 8,269 at the 2010 census and estimated to be 11,176 according to the 2018 Census. It is included in the Logan, Utah-Idaho (partial) Metropolitan Statistical Area. The city is mainly composed of residential sub-divisions and is a suburb of the county seat, Logan.

North Logan was first settled in 1890.

Geography
According to the United States Census Bureau, the city has a total area of 6.9 square miles (17.9 km), of which 6.9 square miles (17.9 km) is land and 0.14% is water.

On the west, North Logan has views of the Wellsville Mountains. To the east of North Logan is the Mt. Naomi Wilderness.

Government 
The Mayor of North Logan is Lyndsay Peterson. The City Council includes Roger T. Anderson, Craig Humphreys, Buzzy Mullakhel, Emily Schmidt, and Joni Kartchner. The city elects its council members at large, rather than through a district system.

Demographics

At the 2000 census there were 6,163 people in 1,728 households, including 1,461 families, in the city. The racial makeup of the city was 94.35% White, 0.49% African American, 0.28% Native American, 2.01% Asian, 0.13% Pacific Islander, 1.38% from other races, and 1.36% from two or more races. Hispanic or Latino of any race were 3.60%.

Of the 1,728 households 52.5% had children under the age of 18 living with them, 73.0% were married couples living together, 8.9% had a female householder with no husband present, and 15.4% were non-families. 8.9% of households were one person and 2.5% were one person aged 65 or older. The average household size was 3.56 and the average family size was 3.84.

The age distribution was 37.4% under the age of 18, 14.3% from 18 to 24, 27.3% from 25 to 44, 15.3% from 45 to 64, and 5.7% 65 or older. The median age was 24 years. For every 100 females, there were 103.3 males. For every 100 females age 18 and over, there were 97.2 males.

The median household income was $49,154 and the median family income  was $51,573. Males had a median income of $40,302 versus $25,461 for females. The per capita income for the city was $17,491. About 4.0% of families and 6.0% of the population were below the poverty line, including 7.4% of those under age 18 and none of those age 65 or over.

References

External links
 Official website

Cities in Cache County, Utah
Cities in Utah
Logan metropolitan area
Populated places established in 1890